Switzerland made detailed plans to acquire and test nuclear weapons during the Cold War. Less than two weeks after the nuclear bombings of Hiroshima and Nagasaki, the Swiss government started studying the possibility of building nuclear weapons, and continued its military nuclear program for 43 years until 1988. It has since signed and ratified the Treaty on the Non-Proliferation of Nuclear Weapons. Switzerland never possessed biological weapons, but did have a program of the Swiss Army high command to develop and test chemical weapons.

Military nuclear program 

On 15 August 1945, Hans Frick, a colonel in the Swiss military, sent a letter to Federal Councillor Karl Kobelt requesting that Switzerland study the possibility of acquiring nuclear weapons in order to defend itself. The Federal Council authorized the creation of a commission to do such in November 1945. Efforts "were well under way" in 1945.

On 8 June 1946, the Study Commission for Nuclear Energy ( – SKA) was created by the Swiss government under the leadership of Dr. Paul Scherrer, a physicist and professor at ETH Zurich. The commission had the objective of studying the civil use of atomic energy and the secret objective of studying the scientific and technical basis for building nuclear weapons. The activity of this group was low and only slow progress was made; however the events of the Cold War, especially the Soviet invasion of Hungary in 1956 and the nuclear arms race of the mid-1950s, provided new impetus. While his specific role is questioned, Scherrer played an important role in the Swiss nuclear program.

The secret Study Commission for the Possible Acquisition of Own Nuclear Arms was instituted by Chief of General Staff Louis de Montmollin with a meeting on 29 March 1957. The aim of the commission was to give the Swiss Federal Council an orientation towards "the possibility of the acquisition of nuclear arms in Switzerland." The recommendations of the commission were ultimately favorable.

The Federal Council released a public statement on 11 July 1958 stating that although a world without nuclear weapons was in Switzerland's interest, its neighboring countries adopting nuclear weapons would force it to do likewise. On 23 December 1958 the Federal Council instructed the Military Department to study the logistics and execution of attaining nuclear arms. However, efforts remained focused on study and planning rather than implementation.

In a referendum held in April 1962, the Swiss people rejected a proposal to ban nuclear weapons within the country. The next year in May, Swiss voters again rejected a referendum that would have required Swiss voters to approve of the Armed Forces being equipped in nuclear weapons if it chose to do so.

By 1963, planning had proceeded to the point that detailed technical proposals, specific arsenals, and cost estimates were made. On 15 November 1963, Dr. Paul Schmid prepared a 58-page report laying the theoretical foundations for Swiss nuclear armaments. On 28 November 1963, the Deputy Chief of the General Staff estimated that the costs of building a uranium bomb at 720 million Swiss francs over 35 years, initially including 20 million francs for pure research, that would be needed for planning. It also calculated that, should the decision be for plutonium instead of highly enriched uranium, then the estimate would be 2,100 million francs over 27 years. On 4 May 1964, the military joint staff issued a recommendation to have about 100 bombs (60–100 kilotons), 50 artillery shells (5 kt), and 100 rockets (100 kt) within the next 15 years, at costs of about 750 million Swiss francs. There were plans for 7 underground nuclear tests in "uninhabited regions" of Switzerland – a location with a radius of  "that can be sealed off completely."

In addition to this, Switzerland purchased uranium and stored it in nuclear reactors purchased from the United States, the first of which was built in 1960. Additionally, in 1969, the Swiss government unsuccessfully tried to purchase  of weapons-grade plutonium from Norway.

In the spring of 1964, a group working within the Military Department, which approved of nuclear tests in Switzerland, presented a secret plan for the attainment of nuclear weapons to the Federal Council. In the first phase of the plan, 50 bombs from 60–100 kt would be procured. In phase two, another 200 bombs would be procured. To clarify definitively whether nuclear tests should be carried out in Switzerland, the military chief of staff Jacob Annasohn requested of Federal Councillor Paul Chaudet, head of the Military Department, to obtain authorization for the total budget of 20 million Swiss francs from the Federal Council.

Besides having a main military goal of deterrence, strategists envisioned the Swiss nuclear strike capability as part of a preemptive war against the Soviet Union. The Swiss Air Force Mirage III jet would have been able to carry nuclear bombs as far as Moscow. They also suggested the weapons could be used on Swiss soil against a possible invading force.

Switzerland possessed  of separated plutonium coming from reprocessed spent fuel of the heavy water research reactor DIORIT. It was stored for several decades under International Atomic Energy Agency safeguards at the Paul Scherrer Institute, but this supply was not directly suitable for building nuclear weapons. In February 2016, nearly three decades after the end of its nuclear program and in time for the 2016 Nuclear Security Summit, the Swiss government shipped this excess plutonium to the United States for disposal.

Financial problems with the defense budget in 1964 prevented the substantial sums required from being allocated. Continuing financial short-falls prevented the proposed effort from getting off the ground. This, as well as a serious accident in 1969 which caused a partial meltdown in the small Lucens pilot reactor, strengthened opposition against the Swiss nuclear program.

Switzerland signed the Treaty on the Non-Proliferation of Nuclear Weapons (NPT) on 27 November 1969, and its process of ratification first met with the resistance of the Federal Department of Defense. After signing the treaty, Switzerland's policy of pursuing acquiring nuclear weapons was replaced by one of studying acquisition to provide options in case the treaty broke down. Switzerland ratified the treaty on 9 March 1977. Soon after that, Switzerland ratified the Seabed Arms Control Treaty.

On 30 April 1969, the Working Committee for Nuclear Issues (AAA) was created. It met 27 times between 26 September 1969 and 25 October 1988. However, the committee had only a preparatory role. As the Cold War started coming to an end, the AAA became less relevant. On 1 November 1988, Federal Councillor Arnold Koller signed the dissolution order, and the AAA ceased to exist on 31 December of that year, thus ending the 43-year Swiss nuclear weapons program.

Nuclear weapons ban
On July 7, 2017, Switzerland voted in favor of the Treaty on the Prohibition of Nuclear Weapons, the first such international treaty to ban nuclear weapons. However, in 2018, the Swiss government changed its position and opposed signing the treaty because of security concerns.

Biological and chemical weapons 
Switzerland did not possess biological weapons, nor did they see it as in their interest to acquire them. Thus the banning of such weapons was in the country's interest. Switzerland signed the Biological Weapons Convention in April 1972 and ratified the treaty in 1976 with three reservations. The country also signed the Chemical Weapons Convention in January 1993 and ratified it in March 1995.

In 1937, General Henri Guisan and the Swiss Army high command commissioned a secret program to develop and utilize chemical weapons. From 1939 onwards, the contact poison sulfur mustard was manufactured, as well as phenacyl chloride. In the summer of 1940, extensive exercises were held in several cantons using mortars with polychlorinated naphthalene gas. In the Canton of Uri alone, 14,000 farm cows were poisoned, which the Swiss Army then euthanized. The program also produced 330 tons of mustard gas, which proved difficult to store and thus the program was halted in 1943 by General Guisan, who ordered the chemical weapons to be burned on the grounds of the Munitionsfabrik Altdorf, known today as RUAG Ammotec.

See also 
 Modern history of Switzerland
 Military history of Switzerland
 Nuclear power in Switzerland
 Anti-nuclear movement in Switzerland
 Friedrich Tinner, Swiss engineer involved in the provision of gas centrifuge technology to Pakistan and Libya through the Khan network.
 Spiez Laboratory
 National Redoubt (Switzerland)

References

Bibliography

Further reading 

Politics of Switzerland
Weapons of mass destruction by country